John Charles Crowley (born November 13, 1947, in Houston, Texas) is an American musician. In his career, he has been a member of the band Player, has recorded one studio album "Beneath the Texas Moon" RCA Records 8370-2-R 1988 and charted several singles on the Billboard country charts.

Career
In 1977, Crowley co-founded the rock band Player, and co-wrote their song "Baby Come Back". He also shared the vocals on both albums, Player and Danger Zone, playing keyboard and guitar and singing on the album. Crowley left Player after their second LP.

He continued as a successful song writer, signing with RCA Records. His biggest success was a song he had written and performed himself called "Paint the Town and Hang the Moon Tonight" in 1988, which was from his only solo LP, Beneath the Texas Moon. This song also appeared on the soundtrack of Clint Eastwood's film Pink Cadillac. He was also named Best New Male Country Vocalist in 1989.

Through the 80's and 90's, his songs were recorded by Johnny Cash, Smokey Robinson, Little River Band, the Oak Ridge Boys, and many more.

Crowley survived a bout of cancer between 1994 and 1999. He lives in Topanga, California.

Discography

Albums

Singles

Music videos

References

1947 births
Living people
People from Houston
American country singer-songwriters
RCA Records artists
Player (band) members
Singer-songwriters from Texas